Grassini is a surname. Notable people with the surname include:

Davide Grassini (born 2000), Italian footballer
Giulio Grassini (1922-1992), first Italian director of the SISDE
Giuseppina Grassini (1773–1850), Italian contralto and singing teacher
Margherita Grassini Sarfatti (1880-1961), Italian journalist and Benito Mussolini's biographer 

Italian-language surnames